Inishcorker (Gaeilge: Inis Corcair) is an uninhabited island in County Clare. Its name is derived from the Irish "inis", meaning  island or river meadow.

Demographics

References

Uninhabited islands of Ireland
Islands of County Clare